The A861 road is a circuitous, primarily coastal, road in Lochaber, within the Highland council area of Scotland.

The last stretch to be built was the part from Kinlochmoidart to Lochailort.  It was opened on 29 July 1966 by the Minister of State for Scotland, George Willis M.P.  Mr Willis described it as the longest completely new road to be built in Scotland since the days of Thomas Telford, 150 years earlier.

Route (clockwise)
The A861 is a long-way-round route in the Lochaber area of western Scotland, connecting the A830 Fort William to Mallaig road with itself via the shores of Loch Sunart.

junction with the A830 road west of Kinlocheil
under the West Highland Line
through Drimsallie
eastwards along the south shore of Loch Eil, through Garvan, Duisky and Blaich
until Loch Eil meets Loch Linnhe and the road turns generally southwestwards through Camusnagaul and Trislaig to Ardgour where the Corran Ferry provides a vehicular crossing to Corran and the main A82 road
the A861 them continues to along the western shore of Loch Linnhe to Inversanda and where it strikes inland westwards through Glen Tarbert; the B8043 road leaving about half a mile from Inversanda to follow the southwesterly route
after passing through Achnalea the A861 resumes its coastal nature when it follows the north shore of Loch Sunart
near this is its only junction (other than its terminuses) with another A-road when the A884 road diverges
continuing westward the road goes through the lochside communities of Strontian, Ardnastang, Woodend, Camasachoirce and Camasine turning slightly to the north to follow the loch to Resipole and Salen
the coast of Loch Sunart is now followed by the B8007 as the A861 strikes inland due north to Acharacle where the B8044 leaves to the west
the A861 then turns east to go through Blain, Mingarrypark and Dalnabreck;
it then turns north and then northwest to reach Loch Moidart and the settlements of Ardmolich and Kinlochmoidart
after following the loch shore it again strikes inland to reach the Sound of Arisaig at Glenuig
the route is then generally northeastwards along the south shore of Loch Ailort through Inverailort to meet the A830 at Lochailort.

References

Lochaber
Roads in Scotland
Scenic routes in the United Kingdom
Transport in Highland (council area)
Works of Thomas Telford